Perspective in pharmacoeconomics refers to the economic vantage point of a pharmacoeconomic analysis, such as a cost-effectiveness analysis or cost-utility analysis. This affects the types of costs (resource expenditures) and benefits that are relevant to the analysis.

Five general perspectives are often cited in pharmacoeconomics, including institutional, third party, patient, governmental and societal. The author must state the perspective and then ensure that costs and valuations remain consistent with it throughout the study, explaining briefly the applicable nomenclature.  This should allow prospective reader to get a better understanding, and a firmer grasp of the subject matter.

If, for example, a pharmacoeconomic study takes the institutional perspective, medication cost would be relevant to resource expenditures involved in therapy delivery. Since the institution (e.g. hospital) incurs this expense, it would be included. Other relevant costs include inventory carrying cost, pharmacy time to compound or dispense, nursing time to administer, disposables (e.g. medication cups or intravenous tubing) and allocated hospital overhead costs
Valuation defines the currency reference that represents the resource expenditure associated with a given cost. The actual "dollar amount" to be attributed to the medication needs to be consistent with the perspective as well. Average wholesaler price (AWP) might not be considered an appropriate valuation of medication cost from an institutional perspective, if it does not represent the cost to the institution.  Average acquisition cost would be more relevant.

More complex perspectives may require broader consideration of costs and more sophisticated valuations. For example, in the "societal" perspective, it is necessary for the author to consider costs that would not be relevant to a given institutional perspective. Examples include lost productivity and lost wages due to illness.

Pharmaceutical industry
Health economics